The 1974–75 Athenian League season was the 52nd in the history of Athenian League. The league consisted of 33 teams.

Division One

The division featured three new teams, promoted from last season's Division Two: 
 Alton Town  (1st)
 Rainham Town  (2nd)
 Leyton  (3rd)

League table

Division Two

The division joined three new teams:
 Egham Town, from Spartan League
 Willesden, from Metropolitan–London League
 Epping Town, from Metropolitan–London League

League table

References

1974–75 in English football leagues
Athenian League